

Champions

Major League Baseball
 American League: Chicago White Stockings
 National League: Pittsburgh Pirates

Other champions
 Minor leagues
 California League: San Francisco Wasps 
 Connecticut State League: Bristol Woodchoppers  
 Eastern League: Rochester Bronchos or Hustlers 
 Inter-Mountain League: Ogden 
 Interstate League or Western Association: champion unknown
 New England League: Portland (ME)
 New York State League: champion unknown
 Pacific Northwest League: Portland Webfoots (OR)
 Southern Association: Nashville Vols

Statistical leaders

1Modern (post-1900) single season batting average record

Notable seasons
 Nap Lajoie of the Philadelphia Athletics hits .426, an AL batting average record that still stands today.  This record is also the modern or post-1900 batting average record and is often cited as the highest batting average of all time.  However, the all-time batting average leader is Hugh Duffy, who hit .440 in 1894.
 Cy Young of the Boston Americans leads the AL in ERA at 1.62 and wins 33 games, 41.8% of the Pilgrims' total.

Major league baseball final standings

American League final standings
Note: The Baltimore Orioles of 1901 became the New York Highlanders in 1903. The Milwaukee Brewers of 1901 became the St. Louis Browns in 1902. The Washington Senators of 1901 became the Minnesota Twins in 1961.

National League final standings

Events

January
 January 4 – The Baltimore Orioles club incorporates.  John McGraw is manager and part-owner.
January 27 - Hugh Duffy Jumps from the Boston Beaneaters to the Milwaukee Brewers. 
 January 28 – The American League formally organizes.  The eight original clubs were the Chicago White Stockings, Milwaukee Brewers, Indianapolis Hoosiers, Detroit Tigers, Kansas City Blues (reconstituted as the Washington Senators (1901–1960), Cleveland Lake Shores, Buffalo Bisons, and Minneapolis Millers.  The Hoosiers, Bisons, and Millers are contracted; the Boston Americans, Baltimore Orioles, and Philadelphia Athletics are admitted.  Teams are limited to 14 players and will play 140 games per season.

February
 February 8 – Philadelphia Phillies second baseman Nap Lajoie, along with pitchers Chick Fraser and Bill Bernhard, jump to the new American League Philadelphia club, the Athletics.
February 27 – The National League Rules Committee decrees that all foul balls are to count as strike balls, except after two strikes. To cut the cost of lost foul balls, the committee urges that batters who foul off good strikes are to be disciplined. The American League will not adopt this rule until the 1903 season. Other new rules: catchers must play within 10 feet of the batter; a ball will be called if the pitcher does not throw to a ready and waiting batter within 20 seconds, and players using indecent or improper language will be banished by the umpire. A ball will be called when a batter is hit by a pitch, but, in a mail vote, the owners will rescind this in April, and a HBP will earn a batter first base.

March
 March 2 – Jimmy Collins, Hugh Duffy, and Billy Sullivan jump the NL for the new AL.  Collins will manage the Boston Americans, Duffy will manage the Milwaukee Brewers, and Sullivan will catch for the Chicago White Stockings.
 March 11 - John McGraw, manager of the Baltimore Orioles of the American League, attempts to sign infielder Charlie Grant, a black man, and attempt to pass him off as a Cherokee Indian named Tokohoma. However, Chicago White Sox president Charles Comiskey recognizes Grant and McGraw's attempt to integrate major league baseball falls apart. 
 March 19 - Pitcher Cy Young jumps from the NL's St. Louis Cardinals to the AL's Boston Americans.
 March 28 – Philadelphia Phillies owner John Rogers files an injunction to stop Nap Lajoie, Bill Bernhard and Chick Fraser from playing for the Phillies' AL rival, the Philadelphia Athletics.

April
 April 3 – Connie Mack, famed Philadelphia Athletics manager, accuses Christy Mathewson of breaking a contract he had signed with the Athletics in January.  Mathewson had in fact accepted money from the Athletics before rejoining the Giants in March.
 April 18 – With a six-run first-inning, the Brooklyn Superbas beat the Philadelphia Phillies 12-7 to open the National League's 1901 season.
 April 24 – The American League begins play as a new Major League.  The Chicago White Stockings defeat the Cleveland Blues 8-2 as Roy Patterson collects his first of 20 wins.
 April 25 – History is made in just the second day of play in the new American League at Bennett Park.  The Milwaukee Brewers are leading the Detroit Tigers 13-4 going into the ninth inning, when the Tigers rally and score 10 runs to win, 14-13. Pop Dillon drives in the winning run with his fourth double of the game, setting a Major League Baseball record with four doubles on Opening Day, that will be matched by Jim Greengrass in 1954.
 April 26 – Christy Mathewson records his first major league victory in the New York Giants' opener, beating the Brooklyn Superbas 5-3.
 April 27 - Billy Clingman of the Washington Senators hits the first home run in franchise history off Wiley Piatt of the Philadelphia Athletics. Washington would go on to win the game 11-5.
 April 28 - The Cleveland Blues defeat the Chicago White Sox 13-1. The Blues (who would later change their name to the Indians) hit 23 singles, 22 of them off White Sox pitcher Bock Baker.

May
 May 1 - Herm McFarland of the Chicago White Sox hits the first gland slam in American League history as the White Sox rout the Detroit Tigers 19-9. The Tigers commit an AL record 12 errors, 10 in the infield. 
 May 2 – This was the date of the American League's first forfeit, with the Detroit Tigers playing the Chicago White Stockings.  The Tigers scored five runs in the top of the ninth to put them on top, 7-5, and the White Stockings began stalling for a rainout.  However, the umpire forfeited the game to the Tigers.
 May 4 - Future politician Fred Brown makes his MLB debut. Brown, who'd later win a seat as a Democrat in New Hampshire, only plays nine games over two years in the major leagues.
 May 8:
 Amos Rusie, pitching for the Cincinnati Reds, makes his first start in more than two years.  He loses, 14-3, and retires after two more appearances.
 With the New York Giants leading the Philadelphia Phillies 9-8 with two out in the ninth, John Ganzel of the Giants pulls the hidden ball trick on Harry Wolverton of the Phillies.  This trick ends the game and preserves the Giants' win.
 May 9 – Earl Moore of the Cleveland Blues pitched nine hitless innings against the Chicago White Stockings before giving up two hits in the 10th inning to lose 4-2.
 May 15 - Watty Lee throws the first shutout in American League history when the Washington Senators blank the Boston Americans 4-0 in Boston. The 21 year-old southpaw, who will finish the season with a 16-16 record, will be the author of two of the eight shutouts thrown in the Junior Circuit's inaugural season.
 May 17 – The Philadelphia Athletics are beating the Washington Senators 7-6 in the bottom of the ninth when Senators player Bill Coughlin hits an apparent game-ending home run.  However, under the rules of the time, Coughlin is credited with just a single, as that is all that it would have taken for the Senators to beat the Athletics.
 May 21 – Andrew Freedman, owner of the New York Giants, refuses to allow umpire Billy Nash inside the Polo Grounds, accusing him of incompetence.
 May 23 – Nap Lajoie, on his way to hitting a record .426 for the Philadelphia Athletics, is considered such a dangerous hitter by the Chicago White Stockings that he is intentionally walked with the bases loaded.
 Scoring nine runs in the bottom of the ninth at Cleveland's League Park, the Blues, later to be known as the Indians, stun the Senators, 14-13. The incredible comeback, which consists of six singles, two doubles, a walk, a hit batsman, and a passed ball, comes after two outs.
 May 27 – Third baseman Jimmy Burke of the Milwaukee Brewers sets an American League record by committing four errors in an inning.  This record will be tied in 1914 by the Cleveland Naps' Ray Chapman, and in 1942 by the Chicago Cubs' Lenny Merullo.
May 30 – In the afternoon game of a holiday doubleheader, the St. Louis Cardinals defeat the New York Giants 6-5 in 10 innings.  An NL record 28,500 fans attend the game.

June
 June 9–17,000 fans attend the Reds–Giants game.  The Giants are up, 15-4, after six innings, when the fans begin to overflow the field.  Over the next two and a half innings, 19 runs score as ground-rule doubles multiply.  As the crowd enters the infield, with the Giants leading 25-13, umpire Bob Emslie forfeits the game to the Giants.  The game ends with a record 31 hits and 13 doubles.
 June 20 – Honus Wagner of the Pittsburgh Pirates steals home twice in one game as the Pirates beat the Giants 7-0.
 The contract of Hughie Jennings is purchased by the Brooklyn Superbas from the Philadelphia Phillies.
 June 24 – Mike Donlin of the Baltimore Orioles goes 6-6 with 2 singles, 2 doubles and 2 triples as the Orioles defeat the Detroit Tigers 17-8.

July
 July 1 – With the Chicago Orphans playing the New York Giants at the Polo Grounds, Jack Doyle, first baseman of the Orphans who was formerly of the Giants, gets into a fight with a fan.  Though the police arrive, Doyle does not get in trouble, though he has to take himself out of the game in the seventh as his hand is hurting.
 July 10 – Harry Davis of the Philadelphia Athletics becomes the first player in American League history to hit for the cycle in a 13-6 victory over the Boston Americans.
 July 15 – New York Giants rookie pitcher Christy Mathewson pitches a no-hitter as the Giants beat the St. Louis Cardinals 5-0.
 July 23 – Fred Clarke of the Pittsburgh Pirates hits for the cycle in a 9-2 win over the Cincinnati Reds.
 July 24 - The playing career of Joe Quinn comes to an end after 17 years when he is released by the Washington Senators.
 July 30 – Philadelphia Athletics second-baseman Nap Lajoie hits for the cycle against the Cleveland Blues.  Philadelphia defeats Cleveland, 11-5.

August
 August 5 - In the second inning of the nightcap against the Boston Americans, Jimmy Hart of the Baltimore Orioles punches umpire John Haskell in the face. The rookie first baseman who hits .311 playing in a total of only 58 games in his major league career, serves a ten-day suspension, but quits after going 4-for-4 upon his return because the team refused to pay the $25 he had been fined.
 August 10 – Dale Gear of the Washington Senators sets an American League record by giving up 41 total bases as he loses 13-0 to the Philadelphia Athletics.  The Athletics pitcher Snake Wiltse has two doubles and two triples, only the third time a pitcher has collected four extra base hits in a game.

September
 September 1 - Days after his contract is sold by the Bridgeport Orators of the Connecticut State League to the Cincinnati Reds, Patsy Dougherty jumps from the NL to the AL's Boston Americans. 
 September 3 – Joe McGinnity of the Baltimore Orioles collects two complete games in one day, beating the Milwaukee Brewers 10-0 and losing to them, 6-1.
 September 5 – The National Association of Professional Baseball Leagues, which would later become known as Minor League Baseball, was formed at a meeting of minor league executives at the Leland Hotel in Chicago.  Patrick T. Powers, president of the Eastern League, became the first president of the NAPBL.  
 September 19 – All games are cancelled due to the recent death of President William McKinley.
 September 21 – Though the Chicago White Stockings lose to the Philadelphia Athletics 10-4, they clinch the first pennant of the American League as the Detroit Tigers beat the Boston Americans 3-1.
 September 23 - The Brooklyn Superbas establish a new franchise record for runs scored in a game when they rout the Cincinnati  Reds, 25-6. Brooklyn scores 11 runs in the fifth inning. 
 September 23 and 24 – Jimmy Sheckard hits grand slams in two consecutive games, as the Brooklyn Dodgers beat the Cincinnati Reds 25-6 on 23rd and 16-2 on 24th.
 September 26 – The Pittsburgh Pirates beat the Brooklyn Dodgers 4-3, thus clinching the 1901 National League pennant.
 September 28 - the Baltimore Orioles sign outfielder Slats Jordan.

October
October 19 - Ed Delahanty, Al Orth, Happy Townsend, and Harry Wolverton all jump from the NL's Philadelphia Phillies to the AL's Washington Senators. Meanwhile, Monte Cross, Bill Duggleby and Elmer Flick all jump from the Phillies to the AL's Philadelphia Athletics.

November
November 5 - Sportsman Park is lease by the American League. Two weeks later, the league transfers the Milwaukee Brewers to St. Louis and the team is renamed the St. Louis Browns.

December
December 19 - Rube Waddell jumps from the Chicago Orphans of the national league to Los Angeles of the California League.

Births

January
January 5 – Luke Sewell
January 8 – Joe Benes
January 11 – George McNamara
January 13 – Fred Schulte
January 24 – John Freeman
January 24 – Grant Gillis
January 24 – Curly Ogden
January 24 – Flint Rhem
January 27 – Fred Heimach
January 28 – Ray Knode

February
February 2 – Otto Miller
February 3 – Ernie Maun
February 6 – Glenn Wright
February 11 – Jimmy O'Connell
February 12 – Virgil Cheeves
February 13 – Herman Layne
February 17 – Eddie Phillips
February 22 – Saul Davis
February 22 – Dan Jessee

March
March 2 – Butch Weis
March 7 – Dick Loftus
March 18 – Johnny Cooney
March 25 – Denver Grigsby
March 26 – Jim Battle

April
April 8 – Carr Smith
April 9 – Vic Sorrell
April 19 – Bernie DeViveiros
April 20 – Frank Wilson
April 22 – Taylor Douthit
April 22 – Jim Mahady
April 22 – Juanelo Mirabal
April 27 – Johnny Stuart

May
May 6 – Earle Brucker
May 10 – Ted Blankenship
May 13 – Pat Burke
May 13 – John Jones
May 13 – Leo Taylor
May 14 – Drew Rader
May 18 – John Happenny
May 19 – Newt Allen
May 22 – Babe Ganzel
May 24 – Mule Shirley
May 25 – Bud Connolly
May 25 – Doc Ozmer
May 28 – Norm Lehr
May 29 – Jim Stroner

June
June 1 – Lou Legett
June 1 – Fred Stiely
June 7 – Jerry Conway
June 8 – Leo Tankersley
June 20 – Pryor McBee

July
July 8 – Tex Wilson
July 9 – Lou Polli
July 20 – Heinie Manush
July 23 – Mack Hillis
July 24 – Bob Adams
July 26 – Doc Gautreau
July 28 – Freddie Fitzsimmons

August
August 2 – Charlie Caldwell
August 9 – Phil Todt
August 14 – Oscar Siemer
August 15 – Les Sweetland
August 16 – Mahlon Higbee
August 17 – Slim Embrey
August 21 – Wes Schulmerich
August 23 – Guy Bush
August 27 – Johnny Berger
August 27 – Phil Collins

September
September 2 – Marty Griffin
September 4 – Al Grabowski
September 11 – George Loepp
September 11 – Monroe Mitchell
September 16 – Ken Ash
September 18 – Tige Stone
September 29 – Rabbit Benton
September 29 – Tony Rensa

October
October 1 – Jimmie Reese
October 5 – Scottie Slayback
October 6 – Carlisle Littlejohn
October 12 – Erv Brame
October 13 – Phil Hensiek
October 16 – Al Yeargin
October 25 – Ray Gardner
October 27 – George Smith
October 30 – Al Kellett
October 31 – Ray Flaskamper

November
November 2 – Jerry Standaert
November 4 – Bill Henderson
November 8 – Beauty McGowan
November 13 – Moose Clabaugh
November 14 – Bill Owens
November 15 – John Dobb
November 15 – Bunny Roser
November 17 – Ed Taylor
November 21 – Johnson Fry
November 22 – Harry Rice
November 22 – Walt Tauscher
November 29 – Buddy Crump
November 30 – Sid Graves
November 30 – Clyde Sukeforth

December
December 1 – Ed Coleman
December 3 – Bennie Tate
December 5 – Ray Moss
December 5 – Carey Selph
December 7 – Ralph Judd
December 11 – Elbert Andrews
December 12 – Bill Moore
December 14 – Les Bell
December 16 – Hugh McMullen
December 23 – Ox Eckhardt
December 25 – Buster Chatham
December 26 – Doc Farrell
December 28 – Wattie Holm
December 30 – Dick Porter

Deaths
February 3 – Tom O'Brien, 27, outfielder for the Baltimore Orioles, Pittsburgh Pirates and New York Giants National League clubs between 1897 and 1900.
February 21 – Dennis Driscoll, 38, second baseman for the 1885 Buffalo Bisons.
February 22 – Tom Kinslow, 35, distinguished catcher during the Dead Ball Era, a career .266 hitter who posted a .923 fielding average for eight teams from 1886 to 1892.
March 3 – Charles Snyder, 28, catcher/outfielder who hit .273 for the 1890 Philadelphia Athletics.
March 24 – Mike Trost, 35[?], backup catcher/centerfielder/first baseman for the 1890 St. Louis Browns and 1895 Louisville Colonels.
March 31 – George Popplein, 60, utility player who appeared in one game for the Baltimore Marylands during the 1873 season.
April 10 – John Hiland, 40, backup infielder for the 1885 Philadelphia Quakers.
April 14 – Pat Sullivan, 38, third baseman/centerfielder for the 1884 Kansas City Cowboys.
April 20 – Bill Yeatman, 62, outfielder who played one game with the 1872 Washington Nationals.
April 30 – Dude Esterbrook, 43, infielder who batted .314 for the pennant-winning 1884 New York Metropolitans
June 17 – Bill Craver, 57, catcher and manager who later was expelled from organized baseball for gambling.
July 9 – Sy Studley, 60, center fielder for the 1872 Washington Nationals of the National Association.
July 11 – Dave McKeough, 37, catcher who hit .231 in part of two seasons for the Rochester Broncos (1890) and Philadelphia Athletics (1891).
July 24 – Joe Simmons, 56, player in National Association for three seasons, them managed the 1884 Wilmington Quicksteps of the Union Association.
August 15 – Gene Bagley, 40, catcher/outfielder for the 1886 New York Giants.
August 15 – Milt Whitehead, 39[?], Canadian shortstop who played in 1884 with the St. Louis Maroons and Kansas City Cowboys.
August 22 – Pete Sweeney, 37, infielder/outfielder who played from 1888 through 1890 for the Nationals, Browns, Athletics and Colonels.
September 23 – Doc McJames, 27, pitcher who posted a 79-80 record with 593 strikeouts and a 3.43 ERA in six seasons, and led the National League with 156 strikeouts in 1897.
October 9 – Chappy Lane, [?], who hit .203 with four home runs in 114 games for the Pittsburgh Alleghenys (1882) and Toledo Blue Stockings (1884), and led American Association first basemen in fielding percentage (1882).
October 16 – Jim Duncan, 28, catcher/first baseman for the Cleveland Spiders and Washington Senators during the 1899 season.
October 31 – John Cahill, 36, outfielder/infielder/pitcher for the Columbus Buckeyes (1884), St. Louis Maroons (1886) and Indianapolis Hoosiers (1887).
November 2 – John Corcoran, 28[?], infielder for the 1895 Pittsburgh Pirates.
November 7 – Tub Welch, 35, catcher/first baseman who hit .261 in 82 games for the Toledo Maumees (1890) and Louisville Colonels (1895).
November 29 – Jim Sullivan, 34, who posted a career pitching record of a 26-28 and was a member of the 1897 National League Champions Boston Beaneaters.
December 19 – Jim Gifford, 56, manager for two American Association teams from 1884 to 1886.
December 28 – George Flynn, 30, outfielder for the 1896 Chicago Cubs.